Makhra is a rural locality (a selo) in Karinskoye Rural Settlement, Alexandrovsky District, Vladimir Oblast, Russia. The population was 223 as of 2010. There are 15 streets.

Geography 
Makhra is located 17 km south of Alexandrov (the district's administrative centre) by road. Yurtsovo is the nearest rural locality.

References 

Rural localities in Alexandrovsky District, Vladimir Oblast
Alexandrovsky Uyezd (Vladimir Governorate)